Garkaz (also romanized as Gerkez and Garkaz; also known as Garkaz and Gerkez) is a village in Jeyransu Rural District, in the Central District of Maneh and Samalqan County, North Khorasan Province, Iran. At the 2006 census, its population was 598, in 146 families.

References 

Garkaz